Lirularia lirulata, common name the pearly top shell, is a species of sea snail, a marine gastropod mollusk in the family Trochidae, the top snails.

Description
The height of the shell attains 6 mm. The solid, umbilicate shell has a globose-conical shape. It is lusterless or slightly shining, purplish, unicolored, or with large radiating white patches above, or around the periphery, or spiral darker lines, or spiral articulated lines. Surface either with (1st) a few (2-4) strong lirae above, their interspaces smooth, the base with about 8 concentric lirulae, or (2d) more numerous narrow irregular lirulae above, those of the base still smaller, or (3d) the spiral sculpture obsolete, surface smooth or nearly so above and beneath. The spire is more or less elevated. The apex is obtuse. The sutures are impressed, sometimes subcanaliculate. The body whorl is convex beneath. The aperture is oblique, oval-rhomboidal, very brilliantly iridescent within, but the acute peristome has a rather broad marginal band of opaque white. The columella is simple. The umbilicus is tubular, with incremental striae within.

Distribution
This species occurs in the Pacific Ocean from Sitka, Alaska, to San Diego, California.

References

External links
 To Biodiversity Heritage Library (2 publications)
 To Encyclopedia of Life
 To ITIS
 To World Register of Marine Species

lirulata
Gastropods described in 1864